Lâ-Todin is a department or commune of Passoré Province in north central Burkina Faso. Its capital lies at the town of Lâ-Todin.

Towns and villages

References

Departments of Burkina Faso
Passoré Province